What Price Paradise is the fourth studio album by English new wave group China Crisis. It was released on CD, LP and Cassette in 1986. The CD version featured one bonus track: "Trading in Gold", originally released on the B-side of the "Arizona Sky" single.

A three CD deluxe edition of the album was released in January 2022. As well as a remaster of the original album, it also featured B-sides, previously unheard four-track demos and a 1987 live performance at the Liverpool Empire.

Track listing
All tracks written by Gary Daly, Gary "Gazza" Johnson, Eddie Lundon, Brian McNeill and Kevin Wilkinson, except where stated.
"It's Everything" – 5:09
"Arizona Sky" – 5:24
"Safe as Houses" – 4:26
"Worlds Apart" (Daly, Johnson, Lundon, McNeill, Wilkinson, Kevin Kelly) – 3:35
"Hampton Beach" – 4:47
"The Understudy" – 5:45
"Best Kept Secret" – 4:08
"We Do the Same" – 4:21
"June Bride" – 3:50
"A Day's Work for the Dayo's Done" – 4:17
"Trading in Gold" – 4:27 (Only appears on the CD version)

Personnel
China Crisis
Gary Daly – vocals
Eddie Lundon – guitar, vocals
Brian McNeill – synthesizer, vocals
Gary "Gazza" Johnson – bass
Kevin Wilkinson – drums, percussion
with:
Stuart Nisbet - guitar
Gary Barnacle - saxophone, flute
Luke Tunney - trumpet, flugelhorn
Pete Thoms - trombone
Martin Ditcham - percussion
Davie Dover, John Lewis - backing vocals
David Bedford - string arrangements, conductor

References

1986 albums
China Crisis albums
Albums produced by Clive Langer
Albums produced by Alan Winstanley
Virgin Records albums